Leiktho is a town in Thandaunggyi Township, Hpa-an District, in Kayin State, Myanmar. In the 2014 census, the town had a population of 48606.

References 

Populated places in Kayin State